This is a list of Alpha Tau Omega chapters. Alpha Tau Omega is a men's fraternity in the United States.

Undergraduate chapters

Community chapters

References

Lists of chapters of United States student societies by society
chapters